Midland High School can refer to one of the following high schools:
 Midland High School (Fremont, Nebraska), private school
 Midland High School (Arkansas), public high school in Pleasant Plains, Arkansas
 Midland High School (Illinois) in Varna, Illinois
 Midland High School (Louisiana) in Midland, Louisiana
 Midland High School (Michigan), public high school in Midland, Michigan
 Midland High School (Midland, Texas), public high school in Midland, Texas
 Midland High School (South Dakota) in Midland, South Dakota

"Midland" is also found in the name of several other high schools:
 Cabell Midland High School, a public high school in Ona, West Virginia
 Midland-Richard Milburn Alternative School in Midland, Texas
 Midland Community High School in Wyoming, Iowa
 Midland Excel Campus School in Midland, Texas
 Midland Park High School in Midland Park, New Jersey
 Midland School, Los Olivos, California
 Midland Trail High School, a public high school in Hico, West Virginia
 Midland Valley High School in Langley, South Carolina